Tun Media is a Norwegian media group that publishes the daily newspaper Nationen, the weekly newspaper Bondebladet and the magazines Traktor and Norsk Landbruk.

The group was established in 2000 after a merger between Landbruksforlaget, Bondebladet and Nationen. It is based in Oslo and the largest owners are TINE (25%), the Norwegian Agrarian Association (25%), Nortura (22,5%) and Landkreditt (8%). The remaining percents are owned by about 800 individuals.

References

2000 establishments in Norway
Mass media companies established in 2000
Mass media companies of Norway
Agriculture in Norway
Companies based in Oslo
Mass media in Oslo